Girl Geek Scotland (GGS) was established in 2008 and is part of the Girl Geek Dinners network. GGS held its first Girl Geek Dinner in Dundee in February 2009. A group in Edinburgh was established shortly after  and GGS has now grown to include groups in Glasgow and Aberdeen.

In September 2009, GGS won funding from the UKRC in a collaborative bid with Leeds Girl Geek Dinners to support a speaker series for 2010 on the theme of "Creativity, Computing and Entrepreneurialism". Through this speaker series GGS intends to support knowledge transfer into business and entrepreneurial activities, which has been identified as key to Britain's economic recovery and future in the Digital Britain Report. The School of Informatics at the University of Edinburgh are acting as the parent organisation for this project. Other key funders which provided match funding are SICSA and WYLLN. There is a growing list of sponsors and partners for this project which now includes NCR Corporation, Blonde Digital, brightsolid, Harvey Nash, British Computer Society, NTI Leeds, Carbon Imagineering, Kilo 75, Codeworks, Digital 20/20 and the WEA (Workers' Educational Association) Scotland.

The Speaker Series was launched in Dundee Contemporary Arts by Silicon Valley Entrepreneur Shanna Telllerman CEO of Wildpockets a spin out company from Carnegie Mellon University's Entertainment Technology Center.

In late 2009, Girl Geek Scotland won funding from Informatic Ventures in Edinburgh, to develop three intensive residential workshops for 2010 on the subjects of 'Creativity into business', 'Developing a Funding Strategy' and 'Negotiation Strategies and Techniques'. The Workshops are for women in pre-start-up business; start-up businesses and existing businesses in the technology sector in Scotland.

The Enterprise Workshops took place over three weekends in September, October and November in 2010 and helped approximately 30 female entrepreneurs progress or develop their enterprise concepts and start-up businesses.

Girl Geek Scotland went dark during 2011–2012 while many of the volunteer organisers needed to focus on their main projects. But in Spring 2013, the GGS organisers were awarded funding for more events 2013–2014. The biggest was a special summer double event called "Conversations with Silicon Valley" that welcomed four inspirational female sector leaders from Silicon Valley to take part in a dinner panel, chaired by Suzanne Doyle-Morris. The guests were Heidi Roizen, Wendy Lea, Ann Winblad, and Karen White; followed by the "Summer Start-Up Party" for the local tech and start-up community.

References

External links

Information technology organisations based in the United Kingdom
Organizations for women in science and technology
Women's organisations based in Scotland